Noël Bernard (fl. 1781–1801) was a Malecite leader in New Brunswick, Canada.

References 
 Biography at the Dictionary of Canadian Biography Online

Maliseet people